Inner Mongolia Radio and Television (NMTV,) is a radio and television network in Hohhot, Inner Mongolia Autonomous Region. The Inner Mongolia Radio Broadcasting Network started in 1950, television in 1960; both were united in 2016. NMTV currently broadcasts in Mandarin and Mongolian.

See also
Mongolian National Broadcaster in Outer Mongolia, Mongolia, Near Inner Mongolia, Northern China, China, Asia

External links
Official Site 

Television networks in China
Mass media in Hohhot
Television channels and stations established in 1960
Television in minority languages